In category theory, a traced monoidal category is a category with some extra structure which gives a reasonable notion of feedback.

A traced symmetric monoidal category is a symmetric monoidal category C together with a family of functions

called a trace, satisfying the following conditions:

 dinaturality in : for every  and 

 vanishing I: for every , (with  being the right unitor),

 vanishing II: for every 

 yanking:

(where  is the symmetry of the monoidal category).

Properties 
 Every compact closed category admits a trace.
 Given a traced monoidal category C, the Int construction generates the free (in some bicategorical sense) compact closure Int(C) of C.

References 
 

Monoidal categories